Mali Moravščak is a small settlement in the Municipality of Sveti Jurij ob Ščavnici of northeastern Slovenia. It lies in the Slovene Hills, just west of Moravci. The area is part of the traditional region of Styria and is now included in the Mura Statistical Region.

References

External links
Mali Moravščak at Geopedia

Populated places in the Municipality of Sveti Jurij ob Ščavnici